1948 in All-Palestine (Gaza) refers to the events, within the jurisdiction of the All-Palestine Government in Gaza Strip under Egyptian protection.

Incumbents
Prime Minister: Ahmed Hilmi Pasha

Events

September
 On September 22, 1948, the All-Palestine Government was proclaimed by the Arab League and immediately recognized by all its members with the exception of Transjordanian Emirate (later the Kingdom of Jordan).

October
 October 15 – The beginning of the IDF's Operation Yoav, aimed at conquering the whole Negev desert.
 October 21 – Battle of Beersheba: The IDF's Negev Brigade occupies Beersheba.

December
 December 27 – The IDF starts Operation Horev, a wide scale attack against the Egyptian army in the Western Negev.
 Late December - the All-Palestine Government relocates to Cairo, following the Israeli offensive on Western Negev and Gaza.

Major public holidays

See also 

1948 in Mandatory Palestine
1948 in Israel

References

 
1948 in Asia